Rosales Airport is an airfield located in Barangay Carmen, Rosales, Pangasinan, in the Philippines. During the World War II era, before and after the occupation of Clark Air Base by the Japanese, Rosales Airport acted as a secondary airfield for U.S. Air Force aircraft stationed there. Rosales Airport is listed by the Civil Aviation Authority of the Philippines as a community airport and active for general aviation and more commonly known as 'Carmen Airstrip' for its proximity to the town.  Its dirt runway is listed with a length of 2625 ft.

http://www.the-airport-guide.com/airport.php?airports_id=12927

Airports in the Philippines
Transportation in Pangasinan
Buildings and structures in Pangasinan